Hajime Watanabe may refer to:
 Hajime Watanabe (animator) (born 1957), animator
 Watanabe Hajime (samurai), samurai of Feudal Japan